Karim Shahabuddin was a Pakistani music director who scored music in Bengali and Urdu films in the late 60s and early 70s. He is known for composing the song, "Dekha Na Tha Kabhi Hum Ne Ye Samaan" (vocalized by Alamgir and Nahid Akhtar) for the 1978 release film, Bobby And Julie.

Early life
Shahabuddin was born into a business family in Mumbai, India. His family migrated to Dhaka, East Pakistan in 1960s.

Career

Film
Shahabuddin started his career as a music director with Bengali movies from Dhaka, East Pakistan. His first Urdu film "Ye Bhi Ek Kahani" was released in 1964. His first breakthrough was film "Chand Aur Chandini" (1968) and all the songs composed by Shahabuddin for the move became very popular; "Ay Jahan, Ab Hay Manzil Kahan, Chhut Geya Hamsafar, Kho Geya Karwan (Singer: Ahmad Rushdi), " Jan-e-Tamana, Khat Hay Tumhara, Pyar Bhara Afsana (Singer: Ahmad Rushdi), "Teri Yaad Aa Geyi, Gham Khushi Mein Dhall Geye" (Singer: Masood Rana), to mention a few. Shahabuddin's last film in East Pakistan was, "Payal" (1970).
After the separation of East Pakistan, Shahabuddin came to Lahore and got a chance to compose music for an action Lollywood movie, "Inteqaam Ke Sholay" (1976), but its music went unnoticed. Then in 1978, he signed a movie, "Sharmeeli" as a music director and composed a very popular song, "Jee Rahay Hein Hum Tanha" (vocalized by A. Nayyar) for the movie. In the same year, he gave music for a movie, "Bobby And Jollie". The film was a flop show, but its songs became super hit, especially the song, "Dekha Na Tha Kabhi Hum Ne Ye Samaan" (Singers: Alamgir and Naheed Akhtar) became an iconic Pakistani music history.
Apart from films, Shahabuddin also did some private albums and composed flight music for the PIA.

Television
In the later years of 1970s, Shahabuddin joined Pakistan television Karachi. For many years, he composed background music for Tariq Aziz's popular TV show "Neelam Ghar". He arranged music for the PTV awards show in 1980.

Filmography
 1964: Yeh Bhi Ek Kahani (Urdu)
 1968: Chand Aur Chandni (Urdu)
 1968: Jungli Phool (Urdu)
 1968: Gori (Urdu)
 1969: Bijli (Urdu) 
 1969: Mukti (Bengali)
 1970: Bablu (Bengali)
 1970: Payel (Urdu)
 1970: Nupur (Bengali dubbed)
 1972: Chhondo Hariye Gelo (Bengali)
 1976: Inteqam Kay Sholay (Urdu)
 1978: Sharmili (Urdu)
 1978: Bobby And Julie (Urdu)
 Unreleased: Aadhi Larki (Urdu)

Popular compositions
Shahabuddin composed 58 songs in 9 films:
 1968 (Film: Chand Aur Chandni): Jan-e-Tamana, Khat Hay Tumhara, Pyar Bhara Afsana ... Singer(s): Ahmad Rushdi, Poet: Suroor Barabankvi
 1968 (Film: Chand Aur Chandni): Teri Yaad Aa Geyi, Gham Khushi Mein Dhall Geye ... Singer(s): Masood Rana, Poet: Suroor Barabankvi
 1968 (Film: Chand Aur Chandni): Tujhay Pyar Ki Qasm Hay, Mera Pyar Ban Kay Aa Ja ... Singer(s): Masood Rana/Mala Begum, Poet: Suroor Barabankvi
 1968 (Film: Chand Aur Chandni): Yeh Samaa, Mouj Ka Karwan, Aaj A Hamsafar, Lay Chala Hay ... Singer(s): Mala Begum/Masood Rana, Poet: Suroor Barabankvi
 1978 (Film: Bobby And Julie): Dekha Na Tha Kabhi Hum Ne Yeh Samaa ... Singer(s): Alamgir/Naheed Akhtar, Poet: Adeem Hashmi
 1978 (Film: Bobby And Julie): Baharen, Teray Aanay Say ... Singer: Alamgir , Poet: Adeem Hashmi
 1978 (Film: Sharmili): Jee Rahay Hayn Ham Tanha Aur Tera Gham Tanha ... Singer(s): A. Nayyar, Poet: Younis Hamdam

Death
In the later years of his life, Shahabuddin had moved to U.S along with his family and died there.

References

Year of birth unknown
Pakistani composers
Pakistani film score composers